Shahin Majidi (born May 22, 1988) is an Iranian football player, who currently plays of the Persian Gulf Pro League.

References

1988 births
Living people
Esteghlal Ahvaz players
Iranian footballers
Association football midfielders
People from Karaj
21st-century Iranian people